Ana Consuelo Duato Boix (born 18 June 1968) is a Spanish actress, who is best known of portraying Mercedes Fernández López in the television series Cuéntame cómo pasó.

Biography 
Ana Consuelo Duato Boix was born on 18 June 1968, in Valencia. She has one older sister, named Zulema Duato Boix. She is the cousin of famous dancer and choreographer Nacho Duato.

Personal life 
In 1989, she married the television producer Miguel Ángel Bernardeau Maestro. On 12 December 1996, she gave birth to the couple's first child, a boy, whom they called Miguel Bernardeau. In 2004, she gave birth to the couple's second child, a girl, whom they called María Bernardeau Duato, was born in Madrid, Spain.

Lawsuits 
On 7 April 2016, Ana Duato was accused of Tax evasion and Money laundering crimes together with the actor, Imanol Arias and her husband, Miguel Ángel Bernardeau, in the Panama Papers scandal as the owner of an offshore company, Trekel Trading Limited, based on the island nation of Niue that held a bank account under his complete control at the Swiss bank Banque Franck SA. In May 2016, a judicial investigation was opened for the alleged crimes.

Career 
Ana Duato first role was with the Spanish director Basilio Martín Patino in 1987.

She currently appears in the most awarded series on Televisión Española, Cuéntame cómo pasó, in the role of the mother of a Spanish middle-class family during the years of Francoist Spain and the years of the Spanish transition to democracy.

UNICEF

As part of her charity work, Ana Duato has been one of the UNICEF Goodwill Ambassadors since December 2000.

Filmography

Movies

Television

External links

References

1968 births
Living people
20th-century Spanish actresses
21st-century Spanish actresses
People named in the Panama Papers